WALC is a radio station located in Charleston, South Carolina. The station is licensed by the Federal Communications Commission (FCC) to broadcast with 13.5 kW on 100.5 FM.  It is owned by the Radio Training Network and broadcasts a Contemporary Christian format under the name HIS Radio 100.5.

Programming includes music by such artists as MercyMe, Chasen, Newsboys, Chris Tomlin, Steven Curtis Chapman, Jeremy Camp, Avalon, Toby Mac, and Mark Schultz, as well a few family ministries such as those of Dr. James Dobson and Charles Stanley.  However, the station focuses primarily on music programming.

History
100.5 signed on as WSUY on April 4, 1990, adopting a light Adult Contemporary format as "Sunny 100.5". This lasted until late 1997 when the station purchased by Jacor Communications in Charleston and was absorbed by Clear Channel Communications and shifted toward Modern AC as "Alice @ 100.5 under the WLLC call letters.

Alice became a big success by Spring 1998 with its "Lilith Fair-type programming", though program director Todd Haller admitted a lot of people did not even know about the station.

It became WALC with the same format less than a year later. By 2001, the station had shifted toward more of a traditional Hot Adult Contemporary outlet.

In 2004, the station flipped to an Adult Album Alternative format as "100.5 The Drive", later transitioning to Alternative rock after the flip of WAVF.

In 2006, the station was placed in Clear Channel Communications' Aloha Station Trust, LLC of stations to be sold due to FCC regulations.  On November 26, 2008, it was announced that the station had been sold to Radio Training Group, who operates religious stations.  The company also operates WLFJ-FM in Greenville, South Carolina and WAFJ-FM in Augusta, Georgia.  The station switched to a Contemporary Christian music format on January 26, 2009.  The Alternative rock format previously heard on 100.5 is now heard on WRFQ's HD subchannel.  Previously, His Radio was only able to be heard in the area on two translators, at 91.1 and 91.9 FM.  These are now translators relaying WHRZ from Spartanburg, South Carolina.

WKRI Cokesbury, South Carolina, WFBK Fort Mill, South Carolina and WKBR Summerville, South Carolina were sold by Spirit Broadcasting Group Inc. for $460,832. WKBR changed its letters to WZLC September 11, 2014.

References

External links 

Contemporary Christian radio stations in the United States
Radio stations established in 1990
ALC
ALC